The 1967–68 New Orleans Buccaneers season was the 1st season of the ABA and of the Buccaneers. The Pipers finished first in the Western Division, going all the way to the ABA Finals.

In the Western Division semifinals, the Bucs beat the Denver Rockets in five games. In the Division Finals, they won three straight over the Dallas Chaparrals to win the series in five games. In the ABA Finals, the Bucs and the Pittsburgh Pipers split the six games of the series (with a Game 6 loss at home) that set up a pivotal Game 7 in Pittsburgh. The Pipers won the game and the Finals 122–113.

Roster
 24 Jesse Branson – Small forward
 11 Larry Brown – Point guard 
 23 John Comeaux – Forward 
 31 John Dickson – Center
 25 Gerald Govan – Center
 15 Jimmy Jones – Shooting guard
 22 Leland Mitchell – Shooting guard
 34 Doug Moe – Small forward
 32 Jackie Moreland – Power forward
 12 Marlbert Pradd – Shooting guard
 21 Red Robbins – Center
 14 Red Stroud – Guard
 23 Ron Widby – Forward

Final standings

Western Division

Record vs. opponents

Playoffs
Western Division Semifinals

Western Division Finals

ABA Finals

Bucs lose series, 4–3

Awards, records, and honors
1968 ABA All-Star Game played on January 9, 1968
 Doug Moe
 Larry Brown 
 Jimmy Jones
 Red Robbins

Brown (7-of-9 for 17 points) was named All–Star MVP.

References

 Buccaneers on Basketball Reference

New Orleans
New Orleans Buccaneers
New Orleans Buccaneers, 1967-68
New Orleans Buccaneers, 1967-68